Salem Township is a township in Greenwood County, Kansas, USA.  As of the 2000 census, its population was 35.

Geography
The ghost town of Teterville is located in the township.

The streams of Battle Creek and Swing Creek run through this township.

References
 USGS Geographic Names Information System (GNIS)

External links
 City-Data.com

Townships in Greenwood County, Kansas
Townships in Kansas